Eddie Gannon (3 January 1921 – 31 July 1989) was a Dublin-born Irish professional footballer.

He began his career in his native city with Shelbourne before transferring to Distillery then back to Shelbourne before signing for Notts County in August 1946.

He made a big impression in Nottingham and was transferred to Sheffield Wednesday in March 1949.

After a successful career, Eddie returned to Shelbourne where he acted as player manager from 1955 until 1957 .

Signed for Transport F.C. in February 1957 .

He also won 14 caps for the Republic of Ireland national football team, his first appearance coming on 5 December 1948 in a 1-0 defeat to Switzerland. He played for the Republic of Ireland between 1948 and 1955

His nephew Mick Gannon was later capped by his country as well.

External links 
 

1921 births
1989 deaths
Association footballers from County Dublin
Association football midfielders
Republic of Ireland association footballers
Republic of Ireland international footballers
Shelbourne F.C. players
Notts County F.C. players
Sheffield Wednesday F.C. players
League of Ireland players
League of Ireland XI players
English Football League players
Shelbourne F.C. managers
League of Ireland managers
Ireland (FAI) international footballers
Transport F.C. players
Republic of Ireland football managers